Mystriosaurus is an extinct genus of teleosaurid crocodyliform from the Early Jurassic (Toarcian). Fossil specimens have been found in the Whitby Mudstone of England and Posidonia Shale of Germany. The only known species, M. laurillardi, exceeded  in length.

A 2019 phylogenetic analysis found Mystriosaurus to be distinct from Steneosaurus.

See also 

 List of marine reptiles

References 

Thalattosuchians
Prehistoric pseudosuchian genera
Prehistoric marine crocodylomorphs
Early Jurassic crocodylomorphs
Toarcian life
Early Jurassic reptiles of Europe
Fossils of England
Fossils of Germany
Fossil taxa described in 1834
Taxa named by Johann Jakob Kaup